The Minden Wool Warehouse is a historic building at 1615 Railroad Avenue in Minden, Nevada. Built in 1915, it was designed by prominent Nevada architect Frederic Joseph DeLongchamps for Minden founder H. F. Dangberg, as the headquarters of the Dangberg Land and Livestock Company. Carson Valley farmers stored wool and potatoes there to be shipped out of Minden. It was later rented to the Minden Flour Company and a local creamery. It is now an office building for the Bently Nevada Corporation.

It was added to the National Register of Historic Places on August 6, 1986.

References

External links

Industrial buildings and structures on the National Register of Historic Places in Nevada
National Register of Historic Places in Douglas County, Nevada
Industrial buildings completed in 1915
Frederic Joseph DeLongchamps buildings